Milbourne may refer to:

 Milbourne, Northumberland, England
 Milbourne, Wiltshire, a small settlement in Wiltshire, England
 Milbourne House, London, England
 Milbourne Lodge School, Surrey, England
 Milbourne Christopher (1914–1984), American illusionist, magic historian, and author

People with the surname 
 Henry Milbourne (17th century), Welsh magistrate
 Landon Milbourne (b. 1987), American basketball player in the Israeli Basketball Premier League
 Larry Milbourne (b. 1951), American baseball player
 Luke Milbourne (1649–1720), English clergyman, critic and poet
 Richard Milbourne (d. 1624), English bishop
 Richard Milbourne (MP) (d. 1451), English politician

See also 
 Milborne (disambiguation)
 Millbourne, Edmonton, Alberta, Canada
 Millbourne, Pennsylvania